George Bayliss (30 March 1895 – 2 July 1935) was an Australian rules footballer who played in the Victorian Football League (VFL) and the Victorian Football Association (VFA) over three decades.

Football
He played for the Richmond Football Club in 1914 and then again from 1916 to 1923 (inclusive).

He then played for the Footscray Football Club in the Victorian Football Association (VFA) in 1924 then in the VFL in 1925.

He played one game for Camberwell Football Club, in Round 6, 1930.

Death
He died at the Victorian Benevolent Home, at Royal Park, Melbourne,  on 2 July 1935.

Notes

References
 Hogan P: The Tigers Of Old, Richmond FC, (Melbourne), 1996.

External links
 
 
 George A. Bayliss, at The VFA Project.

1895 births
1935 deaths
Australian rules footballers from Victoria (Australia)
Australian Rules footballers: place kick exponents
Richmond Football Club players
Richmond Football Club Premiership players
Western Bulldogs players
Footscray Football Club (VFA) players
Camberwell Football Club players
VFL Leading Goalkicker Medal winners
One-time VFL/AFL Premiership players